Qarah Aghaj (also Romanized as Qarah Āghāj and Qareh Āghāj; also known as Ghareh Aghaj Ghareh, Ghorboon, Ghorgoon, Kara Agāch, and Qareh Āqāj) is a village in Qarah Quyun-e Jonubi Rural District, Qarah Quyun District, Showt County, West Azerbaijan Province, Iran. At the 2006 census, its population was 875, in 207 families.

References 

Populated places in Showt County